Mushatt is a surname. Notable people with the surname include:

Rannie Mushatt in 1958 NFL Draft
Susannah Mushatt, American supercentenarian